Orsippus was a Greek runner from Megara who was famed as the first to run the footrace naked at the Olympic Games and "first of all Greeks to be crowned victor naked." Others argue that it was Acanthus instead who first introduced Greek athletic nudity. Orsippus won the stadion of the 15th Olympic Games in 720 BC.

References

8th-century BC Greek people
Ancient Olympic competitors
Ancient Megarians
Sportspeople from Attica